Martin Augustine Knapp (November 6, 1843 – February 10, 1923) was a United States circuit judge of the United States Commerce Court, the United States Court of Appeals for the Second Circuit, the United States Circuit Courts for the Second Circuit and the United States Court of Appeals for the Fourth Circuit.

Education and career

Born in Spafford, New York, Knapp received a Bachelor of Arts degree from Wesleyan University in 1868 and read law to enter the bar in 1869. He entered private practice in Syracuse, New York in 1870, and was counsel for the municipal corporation of Syracuse 1877 to 1883. In 1891, he was appointed to the Interstate Commerce Commission by President Benjamin Harrison, reappointed in 1897 by President Grover Cleveland, and again reappointed in 1902 by President Theodore Roosevelt, becoming Chairman of the Commission from 1898, where he served until 1910. Under the Erdman Act as ex officio mediator, he assisted in the work of settlement of numerous disputes between the public and the railroads.

Federal judicial service

Knapp was nominated by President William Howard Taft on December 12, 1910, to the United States Commerce Court, the United States Court of Appeals for the Second Circuit and the United States Circuit Courts for the Second Circuit, to a new joint seat authorized by 36 Stat. 539. He was confirmed by the United States Senate on December 20, 1910, and received his commission the same day. On December 31, 1911, the Circuit Courts were abolished and he thereafter served on the Commerce Court and Court of Appeals. On December 13, 1913, the Commerce Court was abolished and he thereafter served only on the Court of Appeals. Knapp was reassigned by operation of law to the United States Court of Appeals for the Fourth Circuit on January 1, 1916, to a new seat authorized by 36 Stat. 539. His service terminated on February 10, 1923, due to his death in Washington, D.C.

Other service and memberships

Knapp was appointed a mediator for two years from March 4, 1911, becoming member of the Board of Mediation and Conciliation under the Newlands Act in 1913, by appointment of President Woodrow Wilson. He was a member of several societies, including the American Academy of Political and Social Science, the American Economic Association, American Political Science Association, and the National Geographical Society.

References

Sources

External links
 Men of Mark in America Biography

|-

|-

1843 births
1923 deaths
Judges of the United States Commerce Court
Judges of the United States Court of Appeals for the Second Circuit
Judges of the United States Court of Appeals for the Fourth Circuit
People of the Interstate Commerce Commission
United States court of appeals judges appointed by William Howard Taft
20th-century American judges
Wesleyan University alumni
United States federal judges admitted to the practice of law by reading law